Early action (EA) is a type of early admission process offered by some institutions for admission to colleges and universities in the United States.  Unlike the regular admissions process, EA usually requires students to submit an application by mid-October or early November of their senior year of high school instead of January 1. Students are notified of the school's decision by early January instead of mid-March or May 1.

In this way, it is similar to many colleges' Early Decision (ED) programs.  Some colleges offer both ED and EA.  ED, however, is a binding commitment to enroll; that is, if accepted under ED, the applicant must withdraw all other applications and enroll at that institution.  Thus, ED does not allow applicants to apply to more than one ED school simultaneously.  Early Action, on the other hand, allows candidates to decline the offer if accepted, and depending on the program, it may be possible for a candidate to apply to one or more EA schools, plus one ED school.  EA can be the best choice for students who know they prefer one particular school since a student will know the result of the application sooner, and to varying extents allows a student to compare aid offers from different schools.

History 
Harvard University, Princeton University, and the University of Virginia dropped all early admissions processes (which were binding early admission programs) in 2007.  The primary reason was a perception that early admission favored some candidate types:Until 2006, UVA offered an “early decision” program, in which students applied early in exchange for a binding commitment to attend if accepted. The program was abolished in 2007 amid concerns that the early decision application pool lacked racial and socioeconomic diversity.All three reversed course in February 2011, restoring an early-admission program, though less restrictive than previous offerings. Yale University and Stanford University switched from early decision to restrictive single-choice early action in the fall of 2002 (for the Class of 2007).  Schools that offer non-restrictive early action include UNC-Chapel Hill, the University of Chicago, Villanova University, the Massachusetts Institute of Technology, and the California Institute of Technology. The University of Notre Dame and Georgetown University also offer early action plans containing various restrictions, but less restrictive than single choice.

EA drives a large volume of applications (helping to lower the school's admission rate and increasing its selectivity) but hurts the admission yield (many admitted students are free to go elsewhere).  For applications subsequent to fall 2019 (for the Class of 2024+), Boston College eliminated its non-binding EA plan in favor of a new ED plan.  Chicago also has adopted ED plans starting with the Class of 2021 but unlike Boston College, Chicago decided to maintain its EA plan.  Virginia has also decided to add an ED plan to its EA offering beginning with the Class of 2024.

Types 
There are two types of EA programs: restrictive early action and non-restrictive early action.  Restrictive Early Action (REA) allows candidates to apply to only one early action institution and to no institutions for early decision, while there are no such restrictions on non-restrictive early action.  Regardless, the applicant is still permitted to reject any offer of admission in both types of early action.

The rules or policies for Early Action vary widely across schools and it is important for the applicant to be aware of any restrictions.

 Harvard, Princeton, and Yale have a Single-Choice Early Action program (SCEA), which restricts the applicant to apply early action to one school and generally prohibits application to any binding early admission programs.   
 Stanford has a Restrictive Early Action (REA) policy which prohibits applying to any private schools under their early program (binding or non binding) and prohibits applying to any public universities under a binding program - but a deferred EA applicant may apply under Early Decision II to other schools.
 Notre Dame and Georgetown offer a restrictive, but not single-choice early action program, allowing the applicant to apply elsewhere as long as the other application is not of a binding nature that would not commit the student to attending the other college.   
 MIT has a non-binding EA plan, but it states that while students are free to apply to early plans or binding ED plans elsewhere, "MIT requires that you respect those rules" in effect at the other schools with regard to those applications (emphasis in original).  As an example, a student applying under Restrictive Early Action to Stanford would be violating the Stanford policy by applying Early Action to MIT also.  Caltech has a similar EA plan which permits the applicant to "apply to as many other schools as you wish as long as you are not violating their policies."
 The majority of schools offering EA use an unrestricted EA plan but because of the unrestricted nature, these EA plans receive a very large number of applications and the admission rate for this pool is correspondingly low.  As of 2019, schools with unrestricted EA plan include Chicago, Tulane, Villanova, Michigan, Georgia Tech, UNC-Chapel Hill, Virginia, Colorado College and a few others. For example, Colorado College reveals that for the Class of 2023, its ED pool had an admit rate of 27%, but its EA pool had only a 15% admit rate, compared to 5% for Regular Decision (overall admit rate was 13.5%)

Admission rate 
Whereas the admission rate for ED tends to be much higher than the rate for Regular Decision (RD) at most schools, EA generally does not offer much of an admissions edge because it is non-binding.  EA drives a large volume of applications (helping to lower the school's admission rate and increasing its selectivity) but hurts the admission yield (many admitted students are free to go elsewhere).

The EA admission rate is notably higher at some public institutions, however.  The EA admit rate for the Class of 2022 for Georgia Tech, UNC and Virginia was 25.8%, 30.4% and 27.8%, compared to the overall admit rate of 22.6%, 21.9% and 26.4% respectively with a majority of applicants applying through EA rather than Regular Decision.

At the more restrictive EA schools, there is a significant difference in admit rate between EA and RD.  In that sense, SCEA or REA is comparable to ED in having a significantly higher admit rate.  These schools likely recognize that their SCEA or REA applicants are "giving up" an early application at another school.

According to Uni in the USA, "The advantage [of early action applications] is you will know much earlier and can plan accordingly. The disadvantage is that candidates who apply this way tend to be much stronger and rejection is more likely than in the regular admission pool."

See also 

 College admissions
 Early decision
 Rolling admission
 College admissions in the United States

References

University and college admissions